Federal Route 161, or Jalan Teluk Datai, is a major federal road in Langkawi Island, Kedah, Malaysia.

Features
 A Temurun Tunnel near Temurun Waterfalls.

At most sections, the Federal Route 161 was built under the JKR R5 road standard, allowing maximum speed limit of up to 90 km/h.

List of junctions and town

References

Malaysian Federal Roads
Roads in Langkawi